Alikhani is a surname of Persian origin. Notable people with the surname include:

Alinaghi Alikhani (1929–2019), Iranian economist 
Ehsan Alikhani (born 1982), Iranian television presenter and director
Ghodratollah Alikhani (born c. 1939), Iranian Shi'a cleric and politician
Hossein Alikhani (died 2008), Iranian businessman
Mohammad Alikhani (politician), Iranian politician 
Yousef Alikhani (born 1975), Iranian writer

Surnames of Iranian origin